Seán Patrick McCurtin (24 June 1896 – 12 November 1982) was an Irish Cumann na nGaedheal politician and National Army officer from County Tipperary.

Active in the Irish War of Independence, McCurtin participated in many ambushes including the one at Modreeny on 3 June 1921. Shortly after the Truce he went north of the border to assist against the B-Specials. He was arrested and sentenced to ten years' imprisonment at Enniskillen assizes on 13 March 1922 for possession of firearms and ammunition, and transferred to Aberdeen prison in 1923. His brother Austin was a commandant in the National Army, killed during the Civil War in County Laois.

McCurtin was first elected to Dáil Éireann while in prison, as a Cumann na nGaedheal Teachta Dála (TD) for the Tipperary constituency at the 1923 general election. The Free State government regarded him as one of a number of political prisoners and demanded their release. The British government undertook to review their cases, and the Northern Ireland prime minister, Sir James Craig, agreed to accept the review's conclusions. McCurtin was released with 32 others on 25 January 1926, and took his seat in the Dáil on 23 March 1926.

McCurtin did not contest the June 1927 general election. He was an unsuccessful candidate at the 1932 and 1933 general elections. His later career was as a solicitor in Nenagh. An attempt was made in 1934 to kill his clerk Michael Flynn. McCurtin became state solicitor for the Division of Tipperary in September 1948.

References

1896 births
1982 deaths
Cumann na nGaedheal TDs
Members of the 4th Dáil
Politicians from County Tipperary
National Army (Ireland) officers
Irish people imprisoned abroad
Prisoners and detainees of Northern Ireland